The individual championship test, grade I, para-equestrian dressage event at the 2020 Summer Paralympics was held on August 26, 2021 at the Olympic Equestrian Centre in Tokyo.

The competition was assessed by a ground jury composed of five judges placed at locations designated E, H, C, M, and B. Each judge rated the competitors' performances with a percentage score. The five scores from the jury were then averaged to determine a rider's total percentage score.

Results 

 WD : withdrawn

References 

 

Individual championship test grade 1